Charmed comics were officially licensed continuations of the popular television series of the same name, which ended its eight-year run in 2006. The comic books were published monthly by Zenescope Entertainment. Charmed: Season 9 served as a continuation set eighteen months after the events of the televised show's final episode and was first released on June 16, 2010. After concluding in 2012, it was succeeded by Charmed: Season 10 which debuted on October 8, 2014 and ended on September 14, 2016. Each season comprises 22-24 issues and one story arc spans between five and seven issues which is reprinted in graphic novel form.

The comics were set in the fictional "Charmed universe" and all content was approved by CBS Consumer Products in order to adhere to the continuity of the franchise. The series narrative followed the Charmed Ones – sisters Piper and Phoebe Halliwell and Paige Matthews – the most powerful good witches in history who use their combined "Power of Three" to protect innocent lives from demonic beings. After being reunited with their late elder sister, Prue, who was killed less than a decade earlier, the four sisters vanquish the demon Rennek in order to safeguard the existence and secrecy of magic. Writers of the comics are also involved in the publication of other Charmed literature, including Paul Ruditis, author of Season 9 and editor of Season 10, whose novel The War on Witches (2015) is set between the events of the two seasons.

The comics were generally well received. One graphic novel volume made The New York Times Best Seller list in early 2011. Initially, only 12 issues were contracted by Zenescope but, due to the success of the first few issues, the contract was doubled to 24 issues per season. The first issue sold out of its initial 17,000 copies in the first three weeks, which prompted Zenescope to release a second printing in time for the release of Issue #2.

Production

Development
Rumors of a comic series began long before Zenescope made the news official in March 2010. Speculation had started to appear online  about the possibility of a comic series much earlier, however, largely due to test sketches appearing on the DeviantArt account of Dave Hoover which featured Holly Marie Combs, Alyssa Milano and Rose McGowan. Speaking on his DeviantArt page, Hoover said:  Months before the title had officially been announced, and before Zenescope gained acquisition of the publication rights for the comic series, the first advertisement for the series featuring the famous triquetra symbol and the tag line "The Girls are Back" written in the series font appeared in the December 16, 2009 issue of the Zenescope comic book Escape From Wonderland #3. However, Zenescope did not officially announce possession of the title until the company had successfully been granted the rights from Fox Consumer Products.

Subsequently, the first press release from Zenescope Entertainment indicated that Charmed, based on the "ultra-popular" media franchise, would be a natural addition to the publisher's pre-existing "sultry and strong female characters". Editor-in-Chief Ralph Tedesco also announced that "the key to this series success is to strike a nice balance in creating a brand new, intriguing storyline for fans of the television show while also not alienating Zenescope and comic book readers who haven't really followed it before". It was further announced that while the TV series had a difficult time due to casting and budget limitations, the comic creators would not have those problems, thus fans may finally see the return of popular characters like Prue and Cole.

Although the comic books feature the likeness of the majority of the actors who appeared in the television series including Alyssa Milano (Phoebe Halliwell), Holly Marie Combs (Piper Halliwell), Rose McGowan (Paige Matthews), Brian Krause (Leo Wyatt) and Julian McMahon (Cole Turner), Shannen Doherty's (Prue Halliwell) likeness does not feature in the comic books. Ralph Tedesco officially released a statement that Shannen Doherty had not given her permission for the comic book creators to use her likeness in the series, saying that “Unfortunately Ms. Doherty has declined to be involved in the comic version of Charmed. This includes the use of her likeness. We had hoped that she would allow us to use her image and that we would be able to bring her into the Charmed comic book exactly as she was in the show but at this point that has become impossible. While Ms. Doherty’s likeness will not be used for the character we are still very excited about the direction we are going with Prue and we hope that fans of Charmed will feel the same way.”

Shannen Doherty revealed at Oz Comic-Con in 2013 that her decision to not give permission for her likeness to be used was based on Zenoscope's unwillingness to pay her to use her likeness.

CBS and Zenescope officially reached an agreement for a tenth season. It was announced in April 2014 that Paul Ruditis stepped down as lead writer and would edit the series, while Pat Shand would write the new story and Elisa Féliz would be pencilling. The first issue of Charmed: Season 10 debuted at New York Comic Con during the weekend of October 9, 2014.

Writing and format
Author Paul Ruditis was hired as lead writer of Season 9 with established Zenescope author Raven Gregory co-writing the first three issues alongside him. Ruditis was already familiar with the "Charmed universe" having previously published three tie-in novels, two official episode guides (co-authored with Diana G. Gallagher), and the Charmed Book of Love Spells. Ruditis and Gregory also co-authored a special Issue 0, which acted as a prequel to the series by summarising the events of the television series in a style reminiscent to the Book of Shadows depicted in the show. For Season 10, Pat Shand assumed the role of writer and Ruditis acted as editor.

Artist Dave Hoover was hired to create the interior artwork while David Seidman was hired to design the covers for the comics, although various guest artists have contributed variant covers for each issue, including Greg Horn, Al Rio, Tony Shasteen and Mark Sparacio. Hoover departed the series after completing Issue 3. Since then various artists have been hired to create the interior artwork such as Marcio Abreu (4, 5 and 7), Carlos Granda (8), Tess Fowler (6 and 11), Dean Kotz (9, 12, 14 and 15), and Reno Maniquis (10 and 13).

Although the process of writing and receiving studio clearance was much the same as for Charmed novels, Ruditis explains, "The big difference now...is that with original episodes no longer airing, we have a lot more freedom than we did on the novels." With the Charmed novels, nothing outrageous could occur to distort established continuity. Stories had to take place "between" episodes, usually in the first half of a given season. Ruditis notes that while "[t]he studio still has to approve the direction we take," no longer does "everything... have to reset by the end. That alone means that nothing is entirely safe." Ruditis and Gregory claim they wanted the series to "grow and evolve" in the new medium, "expand[ing] upon what worked and what didn't work." The creators believe it stands out from the Buffy, Angel and Pushing Daisies television-to-comic adaptations because Charmed has a unique focus on the dynamics of family drama.

According to Shand, the comics and novels based on the franchise were part of the Charmed canon and follow the established continuity of the series.

Publication

Issues

The first issue premiered during San Diego Comic-Con International in July 2010. Initially only 12 issues were contracted by Zenescope, with around five issues comprising one story arc which would be reprinted in graphic novel form. A one-shot issue has also been announced for Issue #6, and another is followed when Issue #13 comes to start the new story arc.

Season 9 (2010–12)

Season 10 (2014–16)

Collected issue

Season 9
The issues were collected together into trade paperbacks:

Season 10
The issues were collected together into trade paperbacks:

Reception
Critical reaction was initially mixed for the first issue, with many reviewers complaining about the lack of story. Reviews for Issue #2 in relation to the story have been much more positive with Fandomania awarding the issue 3/5. However some noted that the issue does a good job at exposing the series to newcomers. 
The artwork however has received the most criticism both for the characters likeness'  and the colouring, which is deemed distracting by a Newsarama reviewer. Christina Flores of ComicImpact.com goes on to say that the interior art is inconsistent, with the character drawings not being as good as those of locations and backgrounds. However, she goes on to say that Ruditis and Gregory open with a strong story and says that Charmed fans will enjoy the issue. Fan response however has been promising with the first issue selling out of its initial 17,000 copies in the first three weeks, which prompted Zenescope to release a second printing in time for the release of Issue #2.

Cast reaction
Alyssa Milano has touched upon the comic series in interviews, talking about how she gave Zenescope her permission to use her likeness for her character.
Rose McGowan and Holly Marie Combs have discussed the comics on Twitter, most notably joking about the cover for Issue #2 which pictures the Charmed Ones naked covered only in leaves.

References

Charmed (TV series)
2010 comics debuts
Comics based on television series